Angoche Airport  is an airport serving Angoche, a city of Nampula Province in Mozambique.

Facilities

References

External links
 

Airports in Mozambique
Buildings and structures in Nampula Province